Bogusław, also Bogosław, Bohusław, Bogsław (Cyrillic: Богуслав) is a Slavic men's name made from the roots Bogu- ("Bóg", "Boga", meaning "God" in Polish, but originally "fortune, chance") and -sław ("fame, glory"). 

It is one of the few Slavic given names that are present throughout the Slavic language family, and is known in Poland since the beginning of the 13th century. It was popular in mediaeval times, where it has been recorded for about 700 people and during the 20th and early  21st centuries. It only dropped in popularity during the 16th century. Common among most Slavic nations, today the name is usually found among Polish-speakers.

The female equivalent of this Slavic name is Bogusława. Typical diminutive versions of the name in Polish include: (male) Bosław, Boguś, Bogdan, Bohusz, Bogoń, Bogosz, Bogunek, Bost, Bosz, Boszek; (female) Boguta, Bogna, Bogota, Bogusza, Boszuta.

Given names 

 Bogusław Bobrański (1904–1991), chemist
 Bogislaw von Bonin (1908–1980), German Wehrmacht officer and journalist
 Bogusław Bosak (born 1968), politician
 Bogusław Cygan (born 1964), football player
 Bogusław Fornalczyk (born 1937), cyclist
 Bogusław Kaczmarek (born 1950), football player and manager
 Bogusław Kaczyński (1942–2016), music journalist
 Bogusław Kowalski (born 1964), politician
 Bogusław Leszczyński (1614–1659), nobleman
 Bogusław Liberadzki (born 1948), economist and politician
 Bogusław Linda (born 1952), actor
 Bogusław Lustyk (born 1940), poster artist
 Bogusław Mamiński (born 1955), long distance runner
 Bohuslav Martinů (1890–1959), Czech composer of modern classical music
 Boguslaw Plich (born 1959), football player and manager
 Bogusław Polch (1941–2020), comic book artist
 Bogusław Radoszewski (ca. 1577–1638), nobleman and priest
 Bogusław Radziwiłł (1620–1669), nobleman
 Bogusław Fryderyk Radziwiłł (1809–1873), nobleman, military officer and politician
 Bogusław Rogalski (born 1972), politician
 Bogusław Samborski (1897–1971), film actor
 Bogusław Schaeffer (1929–2019), composer
 Bogusław Sobczak (born 1979), politician
 Bogusław Sonik (born 1953), politician
 Bogusław Wontor (born 1967), politician
 Bogusław Wos, 2022 missile explosion in Poland victim
 Bogusław Wróblewski (born 1955), critic, literary scholar, and translator
 Bogusław Wyparło (born 1974), football player
 Bogusław Ziętek (born 1964), trade union activist
 Bogusław Zych (1951–1995), fencer

See also
Bogusławski (disambiguation)
 Slavic names

References

Polish masculine given names
Slavic masculine given names
Masculine given names
Theophoric names